Coleophora kandymella is a moth of the family Coleophoridae.

The larvae feed on Calligonum setosum. They feed on the assimilation shoots of their host plant.

References

kandymella
Moths described in 1988